Long Green may refer to:

Long Green, the summit of Cam Spout crags, near Slight Side in the English Lake District
Long Green, Maryland, a small town in the United States
"Long Green", a track by Donald Byrd on the 1955 album Byrd's Word
Louisiana Long Green, a variety of eggplant
Long green wrasse, a fish